Euborlasia is a genus of worms belonging to the family Lineidae.

The species of this genus are found in Europe, North America.

Species:

Euborlasia elizabethae 
Euborlasia gotoensis 
Euborlasia hancocki 
Euborlasia inmaculata 
Euborlasia maxima 
Euborlasia maycoli 
Euborlasia nigrocincta 
Euborlasia obscura 
Euborlasia proteres 
Euborlasia thori 
Euborlasia variegata

References

Nemerteans